Cytoplasmic linker associated protein 1, also known as CLASP1, is a protein which in humans is encoded by the CLASP1 gene.

Function 

CLASP1 belongs to a family of microtubule-associated proteins involved in attachment of microtubules to the cell cortex in animals and plants. CLASPs, such as CLASP1, interact with CLIPs (e.g., CLIP1). In animal cells, CLASP1 is involved in the regulation of microtubule dynamics at the kinetochore and throughout the spindle. CLASP1 controls the interactions of astral microtubules with the cell cortex in mitosis, which is important for the proper positioning and orientation of the spindle.

References

External links

Further reading